Patrick Crowley (14 April 1906 – 17 December 1993) was an Irish Labour Party politician and trade union official. 

He stood for election to Dáil Éireann for the Cork West constituency at the 1943 general election but was not successful. He was a member of Seanad Éireann from 1954 to 1969. He was first elected to the 8th Seanad in 1954 by the Labour Panel, and was re-elected at the 1957, 1961 and 1965 elections. He lost his seat at the 1969 Seanad election.

References

1906 births
1993 deaths
Members of the 8th Seanad
Members of the 9th Seanad
Members of the 10th Seanad
Members of the 11th Seanad
Labour Party (Ireland) senators
Politicians from County Cork
Irish trade unionists